Tony Bandmann (17 May 1848 − 3 October 1907) was a German pianist, painter, piano teacher and theorist of piano technique.

Life 
Born in Hamburg, as a student of Ludwig Deppe, Bandmann was one of the first to have a clear theoretical understanding of the use of weight in piano technique. Since 1893, with a Study on tone formation and technique on the piano, she brought important reasons for the use of weight and the "shoulder-arm-hand chain" in tone formation, in contrast to the piano technique of the 19th century, which emerged from harpsichord playing and was based on "articulation" and "independence" of the fingers (described in the then famous piano school by Lebert and Stark). She collaborated with Friedrich Adolf Steinhausen, who wrote his fundamental work on the physiological principles of piano technique (1905) at her suggestion. She herself described the principles of weight technique in her 1907 treatise Die Gewichtstechnik des Klavierspiels, in whose introduction Steinhausen writes: "Bandmann's work forms the continuation and completion of my study". 

Bandmann died in Hamburg at the age of 69.

Work 
 Tonbildung und Technik auf dem Klavier. Leipzig: Breitkopf & Härtel, 1893
 Die Gewichtstechnik des Klavierspiels, with an introduction by Friedrich Adolf Steinhausen, Leipzig: Breitkopf & Härtel, 1907 – (Digitalisat) – New edition Kessinger Pub Co 2010
 Die Erneuerung der Klaviertechnik nach Liszt. (p.56)

Literature 
Friedrich Adolf Steinhauses, Über die physiologischen Fehler und die Umgestaltung der Klaviertechnik. Leipzig: Breitkopf & Härtel 1905

References 

1848 births
1907 deaths
German classical pianists
German women pianists
19th-century classical pianists
German music educators
Musicians from Hamburg